Tyson Gregory Carter (born January 14, 1998) is an American professional basketball player for Unicaja Málaga of the Spanish Liga ACB, on loan from Russian club Zenit Saint Petersburg. He played college basketball for the Mississippi State Bulldogs.

High school career
Carter played basketball for Starkville High School in Starkville, Mississippi, where his father served as the head coach. As a junior, he averaged 17 points and five assists per game, leading his team to the Class 6A state championship. In his senior season, Carter averaged 21.3 points, 5.2 assists, 4.4 rebounds and 2.1 steals per game, reaching the Class 6A state title game. He was named Mississippi Gatorade Player of the Year and played in the Mississippi-Alabama All-Star game. A four-star recruit, Carter committed to play college basketball for Mississippi State over an offer from Miami (Florida), among others.

College career
Carter averaged 7.5 points and 1.7 rebounds per game as a freshman at Mississippi State. As a sophomore, he averaged 8.9 points, 1.8 rebounds and 1.2 assists per game. Carter posted 10.4 points, two rebounds and 1.2 steals per game as a junior. On November 8, 2019, he scored a season-high 28 points in a 67–58 win over Sam Houston State. As a senior, Carter averaged 13.9 points, 3.1 assists, 2.6 rebounds and 1.1 steals per game and had six games with 20 or more points. Carter started 16 of 31 games and was named the SEC Sixth Man of the Year, becoming the first Mississippi State player to earn that honor. Carter finished his college career with 216 three-pointers, fifth in Mississippi State history. He scored 1,352 points during his career, and alongside his father became the only father-son duo to both score over 1,000 points in SEC history.

Professional career
On June 14, 2020, Carter signed his first professional contract with Lavrio of the Greek Basket League. In 33 games, he averaged 13.8 points, 3.3 rebounds, and 2.7 assists per game, leading the team to the league finals for the first time. On August 21, 2021, Carter agreed to renew his contract with the Greek club. In his second season, he averaged 16.5 points, 2.9 assists, and 2.8 rebounds per game in Greek league play. On December 19, Carter signed with Zenit Saint Petersburg of the VTB United League and the EuroLeague.

In 2022, Carter joined the Phoenix Suns' 2022 NBA Summer League roster.

On August 4, 2022, he has joined Liga ACB side Unicaja on loan.

Career statistics

College

|-
| style="text-align:left;"| 2016–17
| style="text-align:left;"| Mississippi State
| 32 || 12 || 20.2 || .398 || .361 || .818 || 1.7 || .7 || .7 || .1 || 7.5
|-
| style="text-align:left;"| 2017–18
| style="text-align:left;"| Mississippi State
| 37 || 17 || 22.8 || .414 || .341 || .836 || 1.8 || 1.2 || .8 || .0 || 8.9
|-
| style="text-align:left;"| 2018–19
| style="text-align:left;"| Mississippi State
| 34 || 11 || 25.6 || .447 || .366 || .800 || 2.0 || 1.5 || 1.2 || .0 || 10.4
|-
| style="text-align:left;"| 2019–20
| style="text-align:left;"| Mississippi State
| 31 || 16 || 28.6 || .405 || .321 || .871 || 2.6 || 3.1 || 1.1 || .1 || 13.9
|- class="sortbottom"
| style="text-align:center;" colspan="2"| Career
| 134 || 56 || 24.3 || .417 || .346 || .844 || 2.0 || 1.6 || .9 || .1 || 10.1

Personal life
Carter's father, Greg, played basketball for Mississippi State for three years, earning All-SEC honors and being inducted to the school's Sports Hall of Fame. Greg later became the head coach of Starkville High School. Tyson has two daughters.

References

External links
Mississippi State Bulldogs bio

1998 births
Living people
American expatriate basketball people in Greece
American expatriate basketball people in Russia
American expatriate basketball people in Spain
American men's basketball players
Baloncesto Málaga players
Basketball players from Mississippi
BC Zenit Saint Petersburg players
Lavrio B.C. players
Liga ACB players
Mississippi State Bulldogs men's basketball players
People from Starkville, Mississippi
Shooting guards
Starkville High School alumni